Syech bin Abdullah Albar (1908 – October 30, 1947) or better known as Syech Albar (also written Sech Albar) was an Indonesian gambus singer of Hadhrami Arab descendants from Surabaya. Albar was pioneer of gambus music in Indonesia, he has a gambus orchestra named Al Wathon (S. Albar Orchestra) which first aired in 1935 at NIROM Surabaya. In Surabaya, Albar produced many gramophone plate recordings. His gramophone plate recording in 1937 was titled "Zahrotoel Hoesoen", with a description of "modern Arabic songs" and recorded on His Master's Voice (HMV) label. Albar signed a contract with HMV for the first time in 1931. In addition to HMV, the songs of S. Albar Orchestra were also recorded on the Canary Records label.

References

Footnotes

Bibliography

Further reading

External links

 
 

People from Surabaya
1908 births
1947 deaths
Indonesian Muslims
Indonesian people of Yemeni descent
20th-century Indonesian male singers